Richard Maxwell Kenan (March 10, 1940 – December 31, 2020) was an American politician. He served as a member of the South Carolina House of Representatives.

Life and career 
Kenan was born in Greensboro, North Carolina, the son of Archel Clifton and Judson Glenn. He attended Asheboro High School, the University of North Carolina and the University of South Carolina.

In 1975, Kenan was elected to represent the 40th district of the South Carolina House of Representatives.

Kenan died in December 2020, at the age of 80.

References 

1940 births
2020 deaths
Politicians from Greensboro, North Carolina
Members of the South Carolina House of Representatives
20th-century American politicians
University of North Carolina alumni
University of South Carolina alumni